Ilfat Gatyatullin (born August 23, 1977) is a Kazakhstani sprint canoer who competed in the mid-1990s. At the 1996 Summer Olympics in Atlanta, he was eliminated in the repechages of the K-2 500 m event and the semifinals of the K-4 1000 m events.

External links
Sports-Reference.com profile

1977 births
Canoeists at the 1996 Summer Olympics
Kazakhstani male canoeists
Living people
Olympic canoeists of Kazakhstan
Canoeists at the 1998 Asian Games
Asian Games competitors for Kazakhstan
20th-century Kazakhstani people